Bethel United Methodist Church may refer to:
Bethel United Methodist Church (Bethel, Connecticut)
Bethel United Methodist Church (Lake City, Florida)
Bethel United Methodist Church (Bethel Acres, Oklahoma)